Discodance was a Dutch record label which released rare dancetracks on cd-single in the late 1980s to the mid-1990s. The label was comparable with the other Dutch dancelabels Injection and Rams Horn.  They released 117 cd-singles before closing due to poor sales. The catalogue numbers were "Discodance 001 to Discodance 117".
Eventually all of their releases were withdrawn for copyright infringement. Discodance made about 300 copies of every single and were unable to recover each copy.  As a result, every extant Discodance single can be considered a "collectable".  Their most sought-after releases are from Kylie Minogue and the Swedish singer Carola Häggkvist.

Other rare releases were from artists like; Dancedivas, Silva, Becky, Dawn Taylor, DJ Chuck and others.

RELEASES (cd-singles / list is incomplete):

111.001.1 – Becky: The night the music died

111.002.1 – Dawn Taylor: Bring me some love

111.003.1 – Annie Jansen: You've lied 2 me

111.004.1 – Carola: Je ogen hebben geen geheimen meer/Främling

111.005.1 – Mary Peters: Rock en roll

111.006.1 – Debbie: Everybody dance now

111.007.1 – Karin: Het uur van de waarheid

111.008.1 – V/A: Discodance megamix vol. 1

111.009.1 – V/A: Discodance megamix vol. 2

111.010.1 – V/A: Discodance megamix vol. 3

111.011.1 – Jane: What a feeling

111.012.1 – ?

111.013.1 – Dawn Taylor: Feel the beat

111.014.1 – MC Da Dutchee: Fire it up

111.015.1 – Dawn Taylor: Can you feel it

111.016.1 – Karin: 't Is donker in de stad

111.017.1 – Kylie Minogue: The locomotion

111.018.1 – Melissa: I'll say goodbye

111.019.1 – ?

111.020.1 – ?

111.021.1 – Doctor Love: Do u want 2 know

111.022.1 – ?

111.023.1 – Becky: We're gonna party

111.024.1 – 2 Brothers And 1 Friend: Hip de hip

111.026.1 – Kylie Minogue: Je ne sais pas pourquoi

111.027.1 – Laura: Distance

111.028.1 – ?

111.029.1 – Diana Ross: Upside down (re-release/edit version)

111.030.1 – Donna Summer: Hot stuff (re-release/edit version)

111.031.1 – Debbie: Welcome to my world

111.032.1 – Kylie Minogue: Wouldn't change a thing

111.033.1 – Hepie en Hepie: Heb op m'n kussen liggen dromen (houseversie)

111.034.1 – Dana: Niets is eerlijk

111.035.1 – ?

111.036.1 – V/A: Discodance megamix vol. 4

111.037.1 – V/A: Discodance megamix vol. 5

111.038.1 – Kylie Minogue: Kylie's smiley megamix

111.039.1 – ?

111.040.1 – ?

111.041.1 – DJ Chuck: Turn up the bass

111.042.1 – ?

111.043.1 – ?

111.044.1 – ?

111.045.1 – ?

111.046.1 – ?

111.047.1 – ?

111.048.1 – Frederic: Dreaming of you

111.049.1 – Daisy: My angel

111.050.1 – Doctor Love: Let's go bang bang

111.051.1 – ?

111.052.1 – Anneke Gronloh: Brandend zand

111.053.1 – Black is Black: Roll with me

111.054.1 – André: Voel je vrij

111.055.1 – Candi Staton: Young hearts run free

111.056.1 – Sandra: Only one you

111.057.1 – DJ Chuck: Rap part 1

111.058.1 – DJ Chuck: Rap part 2

111.059.1 – Becky: One wild night

111.060.1 – ?

111.061.1 – ?

111.062.1 – ?

111.063.1 – Bernadette: Diamonds

111.064.1 – Karin: Het uur van de waarheid (2nd release)

111.065.1 – Carola: Albatross

111.066.1 – Patricia: Je bent niet hip

111.067.1 – ?

111.068.1 – Patty Brad: You stole a little piece of my heart

111.069.1 – Silva: Broken promises

111.070.1 – Dancedivas: Gold

111.071.1 – Dancedivas: Bei mir bist du schön

111.072.1 – Jojo: Ik wil je!

111.073.1 – Andres: Zij is verliefd op een frikandel

111.074.1 – Silva: I am the Queen

111.075.1 – ?

111.076.1 – ?

111.077.1 – Marcia Hicks: Some country boots

111.078.1 – V/A: Discodance megamix vol. 6

111.079.1 – V/A: Discodance megamix vol. 7

111.080.1 – V/A: Discodance megamix vol. 8

111.081.1 – Rosaly: Ding a dong

111.082.1 – Mac & Katie Kissoon: Freedom

111.083.1 – Silva: Don't you worry 'bout a thing

111.084.1 – ?

111.085.1 – Kees: Dance with me

111.086.1 – ?

111.087.1 – ?

111.088.1 – Kees: What a feeling

111.089.1 – Donna Summer: Bad girls

111.090.1 – La Toya Jackson: Sexbox

111.091.1 – Gitte: Mijn liefde

111.092.1 – Nancy: The power

111.093.1 – Silva: Everytime we touch

111.094.1 – Tina Turner: Beauty is only skindeep

111.095.1 – Eddie Jansen: Nobody

111.096.1 – Dancedivas: I will survive

111.097.1 – Becky: Changes

111.098.1 – Mis-tique: Money, clothes 'n men

111.099.1 – Campbell: Touch me

111.100.1 – MC the Dutchee: Music and you

111.101.1 – ?

111.102.1 – ?

111.103.1 – ?

111.104.1 – Rosaly: Deep inside

111.105.1 – Campbell: Soul medley

111.106.1 – ?

111.107.1 – ?

111.108.1 – Mac & Katie Kissoon: Chirpy chirpy cheep cheep

111.109.1 – ?

111.110.1 – Valeria: Whisky, whisky

111.111.1 – Linda: One more chance

111.112.1 – Annie Jansen: You cheated, you lied

111.113.1 – Lindsy: Mixed emotions

111.114.1 – Totaal: I'm all yours baby (ooh aah)

111.115.1 – Madame Maggy: Bonjour, ça va?

111.116.1 – ?

111.117.1 – A-nita: Good nite

The single of A-nita remains to date the last cd-single released on the label.

See also
 List of record labels

Dutch record labels
Defunct record labels
Electronic dance music record labels